

Bernafon 
Bernafon is a globally operating company that defines and markets hearing aids and hearing aid accessories, including fitting software and consumer apps. Headquartered in Bern, Switzerland, the company employs some 500 people worldwide and operates in over 70 countries.

In its history, Bernafon has achieved many industry milestones and successes, including the world's first digitally programmable hearing instrument, an ChannelFree™ signal processing. In 2017, the new DECS™ technology platform was introduced.

Corporate History 

The story of Bernafon began in 1946, at what was then Gfeller AG, a telephone and telephone system company outside Bern, Switzerland. There were two main reasons for the compoany to enter the hearing instrument business. Shortly after the end of Second World War, management wanted to expand the range of its products, and the head of the company, Hans Gfeller, was himself severely hearing-impaired.

As a result, Hans Gfleller's son and one of his fellow students started building their own hearing instruments. The first model, completed in 1946, saw the device and its battery housed in two separate leather cases. It was therefore given the name A1 2-Pack. The device was soon in demand, and hearing instruments rapidly became an integral part of Gfeller's product range.

In 1987, Gfeller AG merged with Autophon, Hasler and Zellweger Telecommunications to form the Ascom group. This group employed a total of 14,000 workers and was ranked eleventh among the world's telecommunication firms.

A further expansion took place in 1992 with the takeover of the hearing instrument activities of the German firm Robert Bosch GmbH. The integration of Bosch's hearing instrument activities and the simultaneous creation of a production line in Australia proved too great a challenge for the relatively small company.
 
The 1995 takeover of Bernafon by William Demant resulted in the opening of new sales companies and expansion of the product offering.

In 2016, Bernafon celebrated its 70th anniversary in the hearing aid industry.

Products 
 1946: A1 2-Pack, first portable hearing instrument
 1958: G-Series, pocket hearing instrument with transistor
 1963: H-Series, first behind-the-ear instrument
 1986: Charisma, first in-the-ear instrument
 1988: PHOX, world's first digital programmable hearing system
 1992: Audioflex, hearing instrument with remote control
 1999: Smile, first fully digital hearing instrument
 2002: Symbio, world's first ChannellFree™ hearing instrument
 2007: Brite, award-winning design with external speaker
 2012: Chronos Nano, receiver-in-the-ear instrument with Adaptive Feedback Canceller Plus
 2017: Zerena, first made for iPhone® hearing instrument with DECS™ technology
 2019: Viron, first Li-ion rechargeable hearing aid
 2019: Leox, first True Environment Processing™ Super Power | Ultra Power hearing aid
 2020: Alpha, first rechargeable hearing aid with Hybrid Technology™

External links 

 
 William Demant
 Bernafon Hearing Aids

References 

Hearing aid manufacturers
Medical technology companies of Switzerland
Swiss brands